Hutnik Kraków is a Polish football club based in Kraków, Poland.

History
The club was founded in 1950. Hutnik have played seven seasons in the Polish Ekstraklasa (Polish first division). The team's greatest success is a third place in the 1995/96 season, as a result of which they qualified for the UEFA Cup. In that tournament, Hutnik eliminated Khazri Buzovna from Azerbaijan (9:0 and 2:2), SK Sigma Olomouc from Czech Republic (0:1 and 3:1), but were themselves eliminated by AS Monaco (0:1 and 1:3).

The team was dissolved due to its debts and refounded by its fans as Hutnik Nowa Huta in 2010. They were admitted to Polish Fifth Division.

The England national team trained at Hutnik's ground for the Euro 2012 tournament.

Among most famous players who began their careers at Hutnik youth academy are Marcin Wasilewski, Zbigniew Płaszewski, Jan Karaś, Kazimierz Putek, Marek Koźmiński, Dariusz Romuzga, Łukasz Sosin and Michał Pazdan.

Naming history
1952–56: Stal Nowa Huta
1956–84: Hutnik Nowa Huta
1984–2010: Hutnik Kraków
2010–17: Hutnik Nowa Huta Polish pronunciation: 
2017–: Hutnik Kraków  – current name

Honours
 Ekstraklasa
 Third place: 1996
 Polish Cup
 Semifinal: 1990
Polish U-19 Champion: 1985, 1993, 1994
 Polish U-19 Bronze Medal: 1972, 1988
Polish U-17 Champion: 1997

Fans
Traditionally, Hutnik is considered the third largest team in Kraków, behind fierce city rivals Cracovia and Wisła. The majority of their fanbase is from the district of Nowa Huta and club has 3 fan-clubs: Igołomia&Pobiednik, Szczyrzyc, Górale (which compromises of fans from Zakopane and Nowy Targ).

In recent years the team has spent much of its time in the lower divisions unlike their neighbouring rivals, and the city derbies have usually been played against the reserve teams. As a result, they have developed rivalries with other teams such as Unia Tarnów, and Resovia Rzeszów, as well as KSZO Ostrowiec Świętokrzyski and Stal Stalowa Wola with whom they contest the Steelworks derbies.

The fans have friendly relations with fans of 1.FC Magdeburg, which started after one of the Magdeburg fans logged onto a Hutnik fan forum. They also have good relations with fans of Stomil Olsztyn and Wisła Płock. There are also some friendly contacts with fans of Dynamo Kyiv.

European Record

Current squad

Out on loan

Famous players
Players who have been capped.
 Krzysztof Bukalski
 Tomasz Hajto
 Zakari Lambo
 Mirosław Waligóra
 Kazimierz Węgrzyn
 Moussa Yahaya
 Michał Pazdan
 Marek Koźmiński
 Marcin Wasilewski

References

External links
 Official Website of Hutnik Nowa Huta
 Hutnik Kraków – Official Website of Supporters
 Hutnik Kraków – Official Website of Sports Stock Company

 
Football clubs in Kraków
Association football clubs established in 1950
1950 establishments in Poland
Fan-owned football clubs